Stesichora puellaria is a species of moth of subfamily Microniinae of family Uraniidae that is found in New Guinea. The species was first described by Francis Walker in 1866.

References 

Moths of New Guinea
Uraniidae
Moths described in 1866